Donna Chiu (born 19 January 1965) is a Taiwanese singer and former television host. She has won the Golden Bell Award as a host in 2003. She has released a number of albums and has also appeared in films. She is currently engaged in Christian evangelical work.

Discography

Studio albums
 January 1987: 其實你不懂我的心; Actually You Don't Understand My Heart
 February 1988: 跟夏天說再見; Goodbye Summer's Day
 January 1989: 裘海正的戀愛哲學; Donna Chiu's Philosophy of Love
 May 1992: 紐約之戀－坦白; Longing in New York: Confession
 December 1992: 新白娘子傳奇; Legendary of New White Lady
 June 1993: 放下感情－你說你比較習慣一個人; Let Go of the Feelings – You Said You're More Used to the Person
 March 1994: 愛我的人和我愛的人; The One Who Loves Me and the One I Love
 April 1994: 海愛人抒情歌; Song of Sea Lovers
 December 1994: 愛你十分淚七分 Love You 10 Minutes, 7 Minutes of Tears
 September 1995: 放棄也會有快樂-懂愛的人; There may be Happiness in Giving Up: The One Who Understands Love
 November 1996: Butterfly
 July 1997: 看不見的温柔; Invisible Tenderness
 April 1998: 缺氧; Lacking Oxygen
 November 2012: 瓶中淚; Teardrops in the Bottle
 March 2016: 非我勇敢; I am Not Brave
 February 2021: 從未放棄; Never Give Up

Compilation albums
 December 1994: 黃金版－鑽石精選集; One Diamond Collection – Gold Edition
 September 1996: 全盛時期; Heyday
 May 2000: 流金十載－全紀錄; Popular Gold Ten Set of All Record Collection
 May 2009: 最富磁性女歌手; Most Magnetic Female Singer

EPs
 April 2007: 虧欠一生; Owe Life
 July 2010: 愛清倉; Love of Clearance

References

External links

 

1965 births
Living people
Taiwanese Mandopop singers
People from Taitung County
20th-century Taiwanese women singers
21st-century Taiwanese women singers